"Écoute Chérie" is a song by Vendredi sur Mer. It was released on 3 October 2018.

Charts

References

2018 songs
2018 singles
Indie pop songs
Nu-disco songs
French-language Swiss songs